Druzhkivka (Druzhkovka) is a city of oblast significance in Donetsk Oblast (province) of Ukraine. Population: ; 64,557 (2001). The area of the city is 46 km².

Druzhkivka is a city located near the confluence of the Kryvyi Torets and Kazennyi Torets rivers, about 80 km northeast of Donetsk.

History
Historical records indicate that a settlement named Druzhkivka was established in this area by 1781. From the late 19th through the 20th century, Druzhkivka grew into a mid-size industrial city with several large factories producing mining equipment and machinery, hardware, kitchen stoves, china tableware and bricks, as well as several clay-extracting quarries in the city's vicinity. The economic collapse that resulted from the breakup of the Soviet Union resulted in the rapid decline of local industries, with factories closing or barely functioning — a condition that led to high unemployment and a population exodus. When the jobs disappeared, many of them moved away. The current population of less than 60,000 is well below the historical high of at least 80,000 during the mid-1980s. Currently, many residents work part-time in various other countries. However, since temporary foreign workers bring their incomes back home to spend, this has led to the rapid growth in the local services and retail industries. 

During World War II, Druzhkivka was occupied by the German army from October 22, 1941 to February 6, 1943 and again from February 9 to September 6, 1943. During their occupation, the SS killed many local Jews. A witness from the village described the SS hanging Jews along the railway.

During the 2014 pro-Russian conflict in Ukraine the town was captured in mid-April 2014 by pro-Russian separatists. The city was eventually recaptured by Ukrainian forces on 7 July 2014, along with Bakhmut.

Demographics
The population of Druzhkivka as of June 1, 2017 is 67 772 people.

Ethnicity as of the Ukrainian Census of 2001:
 48,302 Ukrainians (64.4%)
 24,122 Russians (32.2%)
 612 Armenians (0.8%)
 490 Belarusians (0.7%)
 216 Tatars (0.3%)

First language as of the 2001 census:
Russian  70.3%
Ukrainian  28.4%
Armenian  0.5%
Belarusian  0.1%

Municipality
Settlements subordinate to Druzhivka city include:
 Druzhkivka;
 Mykolaipillia
 Novohryhorivka
 Novomykolaivka
 Oleksiievo-Druzhkivka
 Raiske

Gallery

External links 

  druzhkovka.com - Druzhkovka city portal
  druzhkovka.info - Wiki-based website about Druzhkivka

References

Cities in Donetsk Oblast
Populated places established in 1781
Yekaterinoslav Governorate
Cities of regional significance in Ukraine
Populated places established in the Russian Empire
Holocaust locations in Ukraine
1781 establishments in the Russian Empire
Kramatorsk Raion